Ruski Bród  is a village in the administrative district of Gmina Przysucha, within Przysucha County, Masovian Voivodeship, in east-central Poland.  Until the local government boundary changes of 1998/99 it was, for administrative purposes, included in the Radom Voivodeship.

Geography 

History 
During World War II , many partisan groups operated in the vicinity of Ruski Bród . The soldiers of Major Hubal were active here , and later units of the Home Army , GL and NSZ . Between January 17 and 19, 1945 , the biggest battle in the Kielce region was fought here (the so-called Kocioł pod Ruskie Bródem ) . It is estimated that there were about 60,000 German soldiers in the Soviet cauldronand their allies. The fights in the village itself and on the edge of the forests lasted 2 days and 2 nights, during which Ruski Bród changed hands many times. The fight (often even with bayonets and shovels ) was fought over individual yards and individual buildings.

The local 1000-year-old primary school is named after Hubalczyk and is a kind of monument to the branch, in the cemetery , the graves of those murdered on April 11, 1940 , in retaliation for Hubal's actions, the inhabitants of the village. A monument dedicated to the soldiers of the Red Army and the Polish Army as well as partisans killed in 1939-45 was erected in the center of the village  . Red Army soldiers were omitted in the new version of the plaque adopted on September 24, 2020, based on the recommendations of the Institute of National Remembrance  .

The town is the seat of the Roman Catholic parish of St. Teresa . Parish Church of st. Teresa, from the Child Jesus comes from 1926 .

References

Villages in Przysucha County